Macrocephenchelys is a genus of eels in the family Congridae.

Species
There are currently two recognized species in this genus:

 Macrocephenchelys brachialis Fowler, 1934
 Macrocephenchelys brevirostris (J. S. T. F. Chen & H. T. C. Weng, 1967) (Rubbernose conger)

References

Congridae